Sunday Aryang is an Ethiopian Australian netball player. Aryang represents the West Coast Fever in Suncorp Super Netball.

Aryang has been described as possessing "high netball nous, stamina and drive through the centre third" as well as "quick footwork and cleanliness at the contest".

Aryang made her debut for the Fever in May 2019, aged 18.

References

External links
 Diamonds profile

Living people
Australian people of Ethiopian descent
Australian netball players
Netball players at the 2022 Commonwealth Games
Commonwealth Games gold medallists for Australia
Commonwealth Games medallists in netball
West Coast Fever players
Suncorp Super Netball players
Western Sting players
Australian Netball League players
Netball players from Western Australia
Sportspeople from Perth, Western Australia
2000 births
Medallists at the 2022 Commonwealth Games